Anolis bicaorum, also known commonly as the Bay Islands anole, is a species of lizard in the family Dactyloidae. The species is endemic to Honduras.

Etymology
The specific name, bicaorum (genitive, plural), is in honor of the members of BICA (Bay Islands Conservation Association) of Honduras.

Taxonomy
A. bicaorum is in the A. auratus species group, and is closest to A. lemurinus.

Description
It is long-limbed and has a large dewlap. Its body is brownish, and its dewlap is blackish with a red margin and oblique rows of white scales.

Reproduction
A. bicaorum is oviparous.

References

Further reading
Brown TW, Maryon DF, Van den Burg MP, Lonsdale G (2017). "Distribution and natural history notes on Norops bicaorum (Squamata: Dactyloidae) endemic to Isla de Utila, Honduras". Mesoamerican Herpetology 4 (2): 493–497.
Köhler G (1996). "Additions to the known herpetofauna of the Isla de Utila (Islas de la Bahia, Honduras) with description of a new species of the genus Norops (Reptilia: Iguanidae)". Senckenbergiana biologica 76 (1/2): 19–28. (Norops bicaorum, new species).
Schulte U (2008). "Der Saumfinger Norops bicaorum (Köhler, 1996) auf Utila, Honduras ". Iguana Rundschreiben 20 (2): 11–15. (in German).
Van Beest P, Hartman M (2003). "De eerste kweek van Norops bicaorum". Lacerta 61 (1): 3–9. (in Dutch).

Anoles
Reptiles of Honduras
Endemic fauna of Honduras
Reptiles described in 1996
Taxa named by Gunther Köhler